Non-English-based programming languages are programming languages that do not use keywords taken from or inspired by English vocabulary.

Prevalence of English-based programming languages 

The use of the English language in the inspiration for the choice of elements, in particular for keywords in computer programming languages and code libraries, represents a significant trend in the history of language design. According to the HOPL online database of languages, out of the 8,500+ programming languages recorded, roughly 2,400 of them were developed in the United States, 600 in the United Kingdom, 160 in Canada, and 75 in Australia.

Thus, over a third of all programming languages have been developed in countries where English is the primary language. This does not take into account the usage share of each programming language, situations where a language was developed in a non-English-speaking country but used English to appeal to an international audience (see the case of Python from the Netherlands, Ruby from Japan, and Lua from Brazil), and situations where it was based on another programming language which used English.

International programming languages 
The concept of international style programming languages was inspired by the work of British computer scientists Christopher Strachey, Peter Landin, and others. It represents a class of languages of which the line of the algorithmic languages ALGOL was exemplary.

ALGOL 68

ALGOL 68's standard document was published in numerous natural languages. The standard allowed the internationalization of the programming language. On December 20, 1968, the "Final Report" (MR 101) was adopted by the Working Group, then subsequently approved by the General Assembly of UNESCO's IFIP for publication. Translations of the standard were made for Russian, German, French, Bulgarian, and then later Japanese. ALGOL 68 went on to become the GOST/ГОСТ-27974-88 standard in the Soviet Union.
 GOST 27974-88 Programming language ALGOL 68 – Язык программирования АЛГОЛ 68
 GOST 27975-88 Programming language ALGOL 68 extended – Язык программирования АЛГОЛ 68 расширенный
In English, Algol68's case statement reads case ~ in ~ out ~ esac. In Russian, this reads выб ~ в ~ либо ~ быв.

Citrine

Localization is the core feature of the Citrine Programming Language. Citrine is designed to be translatable to every written human language. For instance the West Frisian language version is called Citrine/FY. Citrine features localized keywords, localized numbers and localized punctuation. Users can translate code files from one language into another using a string-based approach. At the time of writing, Citrine supports 111 human languages. Support is not limited to well-known languages; all natural human languages are being accepted for inclusion, up to EGIDS-6.

Scheme

While Internationalization is not a part of any Scheme standard, the expressiveness and flexibility of the language allows for the addition of internationalization as a library.  International Scheme is an open source project to which anyone can contribute a translation.  Since translations of Scheme can be loaded as libraries, Scheme programs can be multilingual.

Scratch

Scratch is a block-based educational language. The text of the blocks is translated into many languages, and users can select different translations. Unicode characters are supported in variable and list names. (Scratch lists are not stored inside variables the way arrays or lists are handled in most languages. Variables only store strings, numbers, and, with workarounds, boolean values, while lists are a separate data type that store sequences of these values.) Projects can be "translated" by simply changing the language of the editor, although this does not translate the variable names.

Based on non-English languages

Based on symbols instead of keywords 
 APL – A language based on mathematical notation and abstractions.
 Brainfuck – A minimalist esoteric programming language, created for the purpose of having the smallest possible compiler.
 G – Graphical language used in LabVIEW (not to be confused with G-code).
 Hoon – A systems programming language for Urbit, compiling to Nock.
 J – An APL-like language which uses only ASCII special characters and adds function-level programming.
 Light Pattern – A language which uses a series of photographs rather than text as source code.
 Mouse – A minimalist language created by Dr. Peter Grogono which uses ASCII characters for keywords.
 Piet – An art-based esoteric programming language.
 Plankalkül – The first high-level non-von Neumann programming language, designed by Konrad Zuse during World War II in Germany.
 Whitespace – An esoteric language based on whitespace characters (spaces, tabs, and line breaks).

Modifiable parser syntax 
 Babylscript – A multilingual version of JavaScript which uses multiple tokenizers to support localized keywords in different languages and which allows objects and functions to have different names in different languages.
 Component Pascal – A preprocessor that translates native-language keywords into English in an educational version of the BlackBox Component Builder available as open source. The translation is controlled via a modifiable vocabulary and supported by modifiable compiler error messages. A complete Russian version is used in education, and it should be possible to accommodate other left-to-right languages (e.g., the Kabardian language has been tried as a proof of concept).
 HyperTalk – A programming language, which allows translation via custom resources, used in Apple's HyperCard.
 IronPerunis – An IronPython 2.7 localization to Lithuanian and Russian.
 AppleScript – A language which once allowed for different "dialects" including French and Japanese; however, these were removed in later versions.
 Maude – Completely user-definable syntax and semantics, within the bounds of the ASCII character set.
 Perl – While Perl's keywords and function names are generally in English, it allows modification of its parser to modify the input language, such as in Damian Conway's Lingua::Romana::Perligata module, which allows programs to be written in Latin or Michael G. Schwern's Lingua::tlhInganHol::yIghun Perl language in Klingon. They do not just change the keywords but also the grammar to match the language.
 Perunis – Python 2.6 localization to Lithuanian and Russian.
 Ioke – Ioke is a folding language. It allows writing highly expressive code that writes code. Examples of same program in Chinese, Danish, Hindi and Spanish

References

Sources

External links 
SAKO information page at HOPL – By Diarmuid Pigott

 
Lists of programming languages
Programming languages